Keserwan District (transliteration: Qaḍā' Kisrawān) is a district (qadaa) in Keserwan-Jbeil Governorate, Lebanon, to the northeast of Lebanon's capital Beirut. The capital, Jounieh, is overwhelmingly Maronite Christian. The area is home to the Jabal Moussa Biosphere Reserve.

Etymology
The name of Keserwan is most probably that of a Persian clan named the Kesra, who were early Persian settlers of the region. Kesra (Arabicized version of Khosro) has always been a common Persian name. Keserwan is its plural form.

Demographics
According to voter registration data, the population is overwhelmingly Christian–the highest percentage-wise in the nation–with 97.95% of voters being Christian. Of those, Maronites are the predominant denomination, comprising 92.16% of all voters in the district. The remaining Christians are Greek Melkite Catholics (2.14%), "minority Christians" (1.26%), Orthodox Christians (0.89%), Armenian Orthodox Christians (0.72%), Armenian Catholics (0.66%), and Evangelicals (0.11%).
The Muslim population (2.05%) are divided between Shi'as (1.80%), Sunnis (0.25%), and Alawis (0.01%).

The number of registered voters by sect is as follows (with a total of 94200):

86,044 Maronites
1,995 Greek Melkite Catholics
1,682 Shia Muslims
1,176 Minority Christians
832 Greek Orthodox Christians
668 Armenian Orthodox Christians
619 Armenian Catholic Christians
230 Sunni Muslims 
99 Evangelical Christians
14 Alawites
7 Druze

Electoral constituency
The district is part of the Keserwan-Byblos electoral district, with the district of Keserwan being allocated 5 Maronite seats (and the overall constituency having 7 Maronites and 1 Shi'ia).

Cities, towns, and villages

Aazra
Adma
Ain El Delbeh
Ain el-Rihaneh
Aintoura
Ajaltoun
Aramoun
Ashqout
Attine
Ballouneh
Batha
Bekaata Ashqout
Bekaata Kenaan
Bezhel
Bkerké
Bouar
Bqaatouta (Bkaatouta)
Bzoummar
Chahtoul
Chnaniir
Daraoun
Daraya
Dlebta
Faitroun
Faraya
Fatqa
Ghadir
Ghbaleh
Ghidras
Ghineh
Ghosta
Harissa
Hrajel
Jdaidet Ghazir
Jeita
Jounieh
Jouret Bedran
Jouret Mhad
Jouret el-Termos
Jwar El Hous
Kaslik
Kfardebian
Kfaryassine
Kfour
Kleiat
Maarab
Mayrouba
Nammoura
Okaibe
Rayfoun
Safra
Sahel Alma
Sarba
Sehaileh
Tabarja
Wata El Jawz
Yahchouch
Zouk Mikael
Zouk Mosbeh

See also
Assaf dynasty

References

 
Districts of Lebanon